Alpina Productos Alimenticios S.A. BIC is a Colombian dairy, food, and beverage company that operates in Colombia, Venezuela, Ecuador and the United States. Its products include beverages, milk, baby food, desserts, cheeses, cream and butter, and finesse products. The company was founded in 1945 and is based in Bogotá, Colombia. The company is the third largest dairy producing company in Colombia with sales over US$700 million and with operations in Colombia, Ecuador and Venezuela.

History
In 1945, Max Bazinger and Walter Goggel, two Swiss men arrived in Colombia with the idea of creating a company.

They began searching for areas with rich milk collection and when they encountered Sopó valley, they were fascinated by its similarity to the Swiss landscape. At the time, they bought 500 bottles of milk and with them, they manually produced their dairy products.

After obtaining a bank loan, they acquired 11 acres of land to build their first factory.

Angelica Cortes worked there before she moved to the United States.

In December 2021, Alpina acquired 70% of Clover Sonoma.

See also
Hugo Goeggel

References

External links
Alpina Productos Alimenticios
Superfinanciera Colombia: Alpina Productos Alimenticios S.A.

Food and drink companies established in 1945
Colombian brands
Dairy products companies of Colombia
Companies based in Bogotá
1945 establishments in Colombia